Cotswold Outdoor is a trading brand of Outdoor and Cycle Concepts Limited, who also own the Snow and Rock, Cycle Surgery and Runners Need chains of shops. An outdoor recreation retailer in the United Kingdom and the Republic of Ireland.

History 
Founded in 1974, the company originated in the Cotswolds, and was based in a garage next to the Cotswold Water Park from which the founders sold basic camping accessories. Cotswold Outdoor is the recommended retailer for the National Trust and the Ramblers. Cotswold Outdoor has 79 shops across the United Kingdom, an e-commerce website and a mail order service selling outdoor clothing, camping & climbing equipment, travel clothing and hiking boots.

On 26 April 2019, Outdoor and Cycle Concepts Limited applied for a company voluntary arrangement (CVA) following increased pre-tax losses in a struggling UK retail environment.

Outdoor & Cycle Concepts chief executive Greg Nieuwenhuys resigned in March 2019. Jose Ramon Finch Castro joined the board on 1 April 2019 as Managing Director."

Subsidiaries

 Snow and Rock is a chain of skiing and mountaineering shops. It was founded in the early 1980s by Mike Browne, who borrowed £60,000 from the bank using his house as collateral. Browne opened its first shop on Kensington High Street in London. By 2001, there were eight Snow and Rock shops that collectively had net sales of £22million per year. In 2004, Andrew Brownsword acquired the firm, which then had 11 UK shops, and Browne left the company. 

In 2010, Brownsword sold the firm to LGV Capital, Legal & General's private equity subsidiary. At the time of the acquisition Snowit had 35 shops, employed 450, had £65million in revenue the previous year, and owned Cycle Surgery and Runners Need. In 2015, the PAI Partners-owned AS Adventure Group, which owns Cotswold Outdoor, acquired Snow and Rock, Cycle Surgery and Runners Need, which at the time had 46 shops  In November 2015, Cotswold Outdoor, Snow and Rock, Cycle Surgery and Runners Need became "one single legal entity called Outdoor and Cycle Concepts".

References

External links 
 

Retail companies of the United Kingdom
Retail companies established in 1974